The Battle of Maciejowice was fought on 10 October 1794, between Poland and the Russian Empire.

The Poles were led by Tadeusz Kościuszko. Kościuszko with 6,200 men, who planned to prevent the linking of three larger Russian corps, commanded by generals Fyodor Denisov, Iwan Fersen and Alexander Suvorov. He also had requested the support of Adam Poniński (who had 4,000 soldiers), but Poniński failed to arrive on the battlefield in time.

Battle
Kosciuszko had spent the night in an abandoned manor house of the Zamoyskis with his army in the field in front flanked by woods, and a river behind the house.  Denisov and then Fersen attacked the next morning, and the Poles burned the village on their left flank to prevent it being used as cover.  Initially, the Russian advance was slowed by the mud, but after three hours the Poles ran out of ammunition for their cannons.  The Russian infantry then made a bayonet charge and slaughtered the Poles for the next three hours.

After three horses were shot from under him, Kosciuszko finally tried leaving the battlefield, but his horse tripped. A Cossack stabbed him with a pike from behind, followed by a second Cossack who stabbed him in the left hip.  Attempting to take his own life, Kosciuszko found his pistol empty, and then passed out in the mud, but was not identified as the Polish commanding general. He was stripped by two unknown horsemen, but then saved and carried away from the battlefield by Denisov's Cossacks and later taken prisoner.

Aftermath
Kosciuszko was taken to St. Petersburg by General Alexei Khrushchev and two thousand Russian soldiers.  The news of the fall of Warsaw reached him on 17 November.

The Battle of Maciejowice is commemorated on the Tomb of the Unknown Soldier, Warsaw, with the inscription "MACIEJOWICE 10 X 1794”.

References

External links
 10.10.1794. Battle of Maciejowice, Fersen's Corps OOB
 Соловьев С.М. История падения Польши». — Москва, 1863.
 Рапорт А. В. Суворова П. А. Румянцеву, 3 октября 1794 г., № 433 (РГВИА. ф. ВУА, д. № 2731. ч. I. л. 188).
 Донесение Ф.П. Денисова А. В. Суворову, 30 сентября 1794 г. (РГВИА, ф. ВУА. д. № 2731, ч. I. лл. 180 — 182).
 Рапорт генерал-поручика И. Е. Ферзена А. В. Суворову, 12 октября 1794 г. о сражении при Мацеевицах.

Battles of the Kościuszko Uprising
Alexander Suvorov